Battle of Mir may refer to:

 Battle of Mir (1792)
 Battle of Mir (1812)